The 1982 Torneo Descentralizado was the sixty-sixth season of Peruvian football. A total of 16 teams competed in the tournament. The season was divided into several stages. Universitario won its sixteenth first division title.

Teams

First stage

Northern group

Metropolitan group

Southern group

Second stage

Group A

Group B

Final Group

Promotion / Relegation

Relegation play-off

External links
RSSSF Peru 1982

Peru
Football (soccer)
Peruvian Primera División seasons